The men's 3x3 basketball tournament at the 2019 European Games was held in Minsk, Belarus at the Palova Arena from 21 to 24 June 2019.

Medalists

Pools composition
Teams were seeded following the serpentine system according to their FIBA 3x3 Federation Ranking as of 3 May 2019.

Team rosters

Preliminary round

Pool A

Pool B

Pool C

Pool D

Knockout round

Bracket

Quarterfinals

Semifinals

Bronze medal game

Final

See also
Basketball at the 2019 European Games – Women's tournament

References

Men's